Ben Harry Stone (born January 18, 1935) is an American politician in the state of Mississippi. He served in the Mississippi State Senate from 1968 to 1979.

1935 births
Living people
Democratic Party Mississippi state senators
People from Gulfport, Mississippi
Mississippi lawyers